The Globurău mine is a large mine in the west of Romania in Caraș-Severin County,  north of Orșova and  west of the capital, Bucharest. Globurău is one of the largest manganese reserves in Romania, with estimated reserves of 3 million tons of manganese.

References 

Manganese mines in Romania